Sayed Bashiri (born 30 September 1951) is an Iranian boxer. He competed in the men's light flyweight event at the 1976 Summer Olympics.

References

1951 births
Living people
Iranian male boxers
Olympic boxers of Iran
Boxers at the 1976 Summer Olympics
Place of birth missing (living people)
Light-flyweight boxers